Metanarthecium is a genus of monocotyledonous flowering plants native to eastern Asia. Its only known species is Metanarthecium luteoviride, known from Japan, Korea, and the Kuril Islands.

Two varieties are recognized:

 Metanarthecium luteoviride var. luteoviride - Japan, Korea, and the Kuril Islands
 Metanarthecium luteoviride var. nutans Masam. - Yakushima

References

External links
 Mitomori, のぎらん　（芒蘭）　Metanarthecium luteoviride 多年草 【ゆり科のぎらん属】 　分布地　全国 photo; caption in Japanese

Nartheciaceae
Monotypic Dioscoreales genera
Flora of Eastern Asia
Flora of the Russian Far East